The 2011 Conference USA men's basketball tournament was held March 9–12, 2011, at the Don Haskins Center in El Paso, Texas. 

Seeding for the tournament was determined by the conference standings at the end of the regular season.  Memphis defeated UTEP in the conference final by a score of 67–66. Memphis, as tournament champion, received an automatic bid to the 2011 NCAA Men's Division I Basketball Tournament.

Bracket

 denotes game ended in overtime.

References

Conference USA men's basketball tournament
Tournament
Conference USA men's basketball tournament
Conference USA men's basketball tournament